Charles H. Zeleny (17 September 1878 - 21 December 1939) was an American zoologist of Czech descent. He was a professor at the University of Illinois. He made important contributions to experimental zoology, especially embryology, regeneration, and genetics.

Zeleny was born in Hutchinson, Minnesota, the son of Czech immigrants from Křídla. He was the younger brother of John Zeleny. He died in Urbana, Illinois. He co-supervised Effa Muhse the first female to graduate with a PhD from Indiana University.

References

American zoologists
American people of Czech descent
1878 births
1939 deaths